"Cardboard Box" is the debut single by British girl group Flo from their debut EP, The Lead (2022). The group co-wrote the song alongside Savannah Jada and MNEK, the latter of whom also handled the song's production. The single was released for digital download and streaming through Island Records on 24 March 2022 as the lead single from the EP. A pop and R&B song, it features the group's harmonised vocals over a dancehall-inspired beat with elements of 2000s music. Lyrically, the song describes moving on from an unfaithful romantic partner. Upon its release, the song gained popularity through Instagram, Twitter and TikTok.

Background 
After their formation in 2019, the group spent two years working on music with producers including MNEK. "Cardboard Box" was one of the first songs worked on during these sessions. The single was subsequently released on 24 March 2022. An accompanying music video was published to YouTube on 1 April 2022, which surpassed 900 thousand views within days. A Tweet containing a clip from the music video also attracted over 2 million views and 100 thousand likes on Twitter.

The single has been praised on social media by established artists including SZA, Missy Elliott, JoJo, and Victoria Monét. 

"Cardboard Box" was featured as the lead single for their debut extended play, The Lead (2022). An acoustic version of the song was released to YouTube and streaming services on 27 May 2022. The group also performed the single for Vevo DSCVR, alongside the second single from The Lead, "Immature". The group made their television debut on 7 October 2022, performing the single on US talk show Jimmy Kimmel Live!  An official remix titled "Cardboard Box - Happi Remix" was released on 7 October 2022.

Charts

Accolades

Release history

References 

2022 songs
2022 debut singles
Flo (group) songs
Songs written by MNEK
Island Records singles